Erhan Çınlar (born May 28, 1941, Divriği, Sivas-Turkey) is a probabilist and Professor Emeritus at Princeton University. He was the Norman J. Sollenberger Professor of the department of Operations Research and Financial Engineering (ORFE) at Princeton University.

Academic life 
He received a B.S. in Mathematics and a M.S. and Ph.D. in Industrial Engineering and Operations Research, all from the University of Michigan in 1963, 1964 and 1965, respectively. His dissertation, Analysis of Systems of Queues in Parallel, was supervised by Ralph L. Disney, the academic grandson of logician Bjarni Jónsson.

In 1965, he joined the department of Industrial Engineering and Management Sciences as an assistant professor at Northwestern University. During 1971-1972, he was a visiting professor in the department of Management Science and Engineering at Stanford University, and became full professor of Operations Research in 1972 at Northwestern. He then joined the department of Civil Engineering and Operations Research as a professor at Princeton University in 1985.

Research areas 
Çinlar is the co-founder (along with Kai-lai Chung and Ronald Getoor) of the seminar on stochastic processes, which is an annual conference on probability topics such as Markov processes, Brownian motion, superprocesses, stochastic analysis, and mathematical finance.

Awards 
 INFORMS Expository Writing Award
 2003 class of Fellows of the Institute for Operations Research and the Management Sciences.

References

Living people
1941 births
Probability theorists
Queueing theorists
University of Michigan College of Engineering alumni
Northwestern University faculty
Princeton University faculty
20th-century Turkish mathematicians
Turkish operations researchers
20th-century American mathematicians
American operations researchers
American academics of Turkish descent
Turkish emigrants to the United States
Fellows of the Institute for Operations Research and the Management Sciences
21st-century American mathematicians